Munir Mohand Mohamedi El Kajoui (born 10 May 1989), known simply as Munir, is a professional footballer who plays as a goalkeeper for Saudi Professional League club Al Wehda and the Morocco national team.

He played for Ceuta B, Almería B, Melilla, Numancia, Málaga, Hatayspor and Al Wehda.

Born in Spain, Munir represented Morocco at international level, making his debut in 2015 and being part of the squads at two World Cups and three Africa Cup of Nations tournaments.

Club career
Born in Melilla, Munir played youth football with CG Goyu Ryu and AD Ceuta, and made his debut as a senior with the latter's reserves in the regional leagues. On 29 January 2009 he moved to another reserve team, UD Almería B from Tercera División, but appeared sparingly and was subsequently released.

Munir joined UD Melilla in summer 2009, initially being assigned to the reserves and being definitely promoted to the main squad in the Segunda División B the following year. He acted mainly as a backup to Pedro Dorronsoro in his first two seasons at the club, becoming a starter afterwards.

On 17 June 2014, Munir signed a two-year contract with Segunda División side CD Numancia. On 10 September he made his professional debut, starting in a 1–1 away draw against CD Leganés in the second round of the Copa del Rey and also saving two penalties during the shootout.

Munir made his debut in the second tier on 19 October 2014, playing the full 90 minutes in a 2–0 loss at UD Las Palmas. He was first choice for the remainder of the campaign, overtaking Biel Ribas.

Munir left the Soria team at the end of 2017–18, after losing his starting spot to Aitor Fernández. On 19 July 2018, he joined Málaga CF also in the second division.

From 2020 to 2022, Munir competed in the Turkish Süper Lig with Hatayspor. On 10 June 2022, he agreed to a two-year deal at Saudi Arabian club Al Wehda FC.

International career
Having Moroccan heritage, Munir switched his allegiance to its national team in 2014. On 9 March 2015, he was called up by manager Ezzaki Badou for a friendly against Uruguay to be held late in the month, and made his debut by starting in the 0–1 loss.

On 29 December 2016, Munir was included in Hervé Renard's 23-man squad for the 2017 Africa Cup of Nations, and started the whole tournament ahead of Yassine Bounou. He was also selected to the 2018 FIFA World Cup in Russia, making his first appearance in the World Cup on 15 June in the 1–0 group stage defeat to Iran.

Munir was also selected for the 2019 and 2021 Africa Cup of Nations and the 2022 World Cup. After starter Bounou fell ill shortly before the start of the group-stage fixture against Belgium in the latter tournament, he replaced him and eventually contributed to a 2–0 win in Doha; he and his teammates were part of the first African nation ever to reach the semi-finals of the competition.

Career statistics

International

Honours
Individual
Ricardo Zamora Trophy: 2019–20 Segunda División

References

External links

1989 births
Living people
Citizens of Morocco through descent
Spanish sportspeople of Moroccan descent
Spanish footballers
Moroccan footballers
Footballers from Melilla
Association football goalkeepers
Segunda División players
Segunda División B players
Tercera División players
Divisiones Regionales de Fútbol players
UD Almería B players
UD Melilla footballers
CD Numancia players
Málaga CF players
Süper Lig players
Hatayspor footballers
Saudi Professional League players
Al-Wehda Club (Mecca) players
Morocco international footballers
2017 Africa Cup of Nations players
2018 FIFA World Cup players
2019 Africa Cup of Nations players
2021 Africa Cup of Nations players
2022 FIFA World Cup players
Spanish expatriate footballers
Moroccan expatriate footballers
Expatriate footballers in Turkey
Expatriate footballers in Saudi Arabia
Spanish expatriate sportspeople in Turkey
Moroccan expatriate sportspeople in Turkey
Moroccan expatriate sportspeople in Saudi Arabia